Gotlieb Luty (1842–1904)  was a corporal in the Union Army and a Medal of Honor recipient for his actions in the American Civil War.

Luty enlisted in the Army from Pittsburgh, Pennsylvania in April 1861, and was assigned to the 74th New York Infantry. He continued serving until being wounded at the Battle of Gettysburg.

Medal of Honor citation
Rank and organization: Corporal, Company A, 74th New York Infantry. Place and date: At Chancellorsville, Va., May 3, 1863. Entered service at: West Manchester, Pa. Birth: Allegheny County, Pa. Date of issue: October 5, 1876.

Citation:

Bravely advanced to the enemy's line under heavy fire and brought back valuable information.

See also

 List of Medal of Honor recipients
 List of American Civil War Medal of Honor recipients: G–L

References

External links
 

1842 births
1904 deaths
United States Army Medal of Honor recipients
United States Army soldiers
Military personnel from Pittsburgh
American Civil War recipients of the Medal of Honor